The flag of Talysh-Mughan Autonomous Republic was adopted on August 7, 1993 as the state flag of the unrecognized Talysh-Mughan Autonomous Republic.

Description

The ratio of the width to the length of the Talysh flag is 2:3.  This flag consists of three colored fabrics (tricolor).  These pieces consist of three vertical stripes of equal width, red on the right, white in the middle and green on the left.  The center of the white stripe depicts the sun and the sea.  This image makes up 9/10 of the strip.

Colors and symbols
The Talysh flag, like the flags of other Iranian-speaking peoples, has three colors (red, white and green).

 Red color — It is the color of blood, it glorifies all the Talysh who have been killed throughout history.
 White color — glorifies the spirit of freedom of the people.
 Green color — Islam.
 Sun with twelve rays — glorifies the 12 imams of Islam.
 Sea — glorifies the geographical area inhabited by the Talysh and the Caspian Sea.

References

Talysh-Mughan Autonomous Republic
History of Talysh
Talysh-Mughan Autonomous Republic
Talysh-Mughan Autonomous Republic